USS Clifton was a shallow-draft side-wheel paddle steamer, built in 1861 at Brooklyn, as a civilian ferry. The Union Navy bought her early that December, and commissioned her after having her converted into a gunboat. In 1863 she ran aground, was captured and commissioned into the Texas Marine Department. Her career ended in 1864 when she ran aground and her Confederate crew burned her to prevent her recapture.

US Navy service
Clifton steamed from New York to the Gulf of Mexico in February–March 1862. In April she towed mortar schooners into the Mississippi River and supported them as they bombarded the Confederate fortifications below New Orleans.Following the fall of the forts and city later in the month, she operated with Rear Admiral David Farragut's squadron during its drive up the river to Vicksburg, Mississippi. There, on 28 June 1862 Clifton was damaged by enemy gunfire.

Clifton participated in the Battle of Baton Rouge on 5 August 1862.

In October 1862, Clifton took part in the capture of Galveston, Texas. She helped seize Fort Burton, at Butte La Rose, Louisiana, in April 1863. In mid-July, her crew assisted in capturing the sailing bark H. McGuin. Later in the month she fired on Confederate batteries on the Atchafalaya River, Louisiana.

Capture and Confederate service

On 8 September 1863, during a Union attack on Sabine Pass, Texas, Clifton grounded while under intense cannon fire and was captured.

Entering Confederate service with the Texas Marine Department, Clifton was employed as a gunboat. According to a report made by Colonel S.P. Bankhead, Chief of Artillery for the Department of Texas in mid-December 1863, she was armed with 3 – 9-inch Dahlgren Cannon, 1- 30 pdr Rifle, and 3 – 32 pdr Guns.  On 21 March 1864 she ran aground off Sabine Pass while attempting to run the blockade. After attempts to refloat the ship failed, Clifton was burned by her crew to prevent capture by Union warships.

References

External links
USS Clifton (1862–1863), CSS Clifton (1863–1864)
Daniel D. T. Nestell Papers (Acting Assistant Surgeon on the Clifton)

1861 ships
American Civil War patrol vessels of the United States
Gunboats of the United States Navy
Ship fires
Ships built in Brooklyn
Ships of the Union Navy
Shipwrecks of the American Civil War
Shipwrecks of the Texas coast
Steamships of the United States Navy
Maritime incidents in March 1864
Maritime incidents in September 1863